The Grand Prairie Area Demonstration Project is an interbasin transfer project to provide water to eastern Arkansas for the purposes of agricultural water supply, aquifer recharge, prairie and wetland restoration, water conservation and waterfowl management. The project, conceived by the US Army Corps of Engineers' Memphis District and approved by US Congress in 1950, generally involves the pumping of water from the White River near DeValls Bluff into pipelines and canals throughout Arkansas's Grand Prairie, specifically to farmers in Arkansas, Lonoke and Prairie counties. The new water source is intended to relieve groundwater pumping from the Alluvial and Sparta aquifers that underlie the Prairie.

History
Initially authorized by the Flood Control Act of 1950, the project received $6 million ($ million in today's dollars) from Congress. The act has been in various stages of planning or design ever since. Deferred in 1980 due to a lack of a strong local sponsor, the Grand Prairie-White River Irrigation District was formed by local leaders to continue project development. In 1983, the Arkansas Soil and Water Conservation Commission requested the US Army Corps of Engineers Vicksburg District conduct a study to determine the economic feasibility of the project.

Opposition
The project has encountered significant delays from a variety of groups voicing opposition to the project, including environmentalists, farmers, landowners, taxpayers and duck hunters. The project was also delayed significantly following the discovery of the Ivory-billed woodpecker within the Cache River National Wildlife Refuge in 2004.

Current status
As of 2014, the lower half of the pump station has been constructed at DeValls Bluff. The White River Irrigation District has not obtained subscribers to receive the water once pumping commences.  Costs continue to escalate, and the Corps of Engineers, along with State of Arkansas, have no way of projecting the final cost to complete the project to any certainty.  Farmers are not willing to subscribe when the cost is unknown.  Cost is a concern to farmers as a farmer's profit margins are already small.  If the water can not be provided at a cost affordable to the farmers, there will not be any subscribers.  On the other hand, if the project is not completed in the near future, there will not be any farm activity in the area as pumping water up from the aquifers is already becoming cost prohibitive.  Without the project, at current pumping rates, the aquifers will no longer be a source of water and the farming industry will no longer continue in the area as we know it today.  The economies of the farming communities will suffer and a lot of the population will relocate to find other jobs and sources of income to raise their families.

See also
 
 Rice cultivation in Arkansas

Notes

Further reading

 
 House Document No. 255, 81st Congress, 1st Session, "White and Arkansas Rivers and Tributaries, Grand Prairie Region, Arkansas," July 1949. 
 House Document No. 308, 88th Congress, 2nd Session, Mississippi River and Tributaries, Grand Prairie Region and Bayou Meto Basin, Arkansas," Annex P, October 1959.
  
  
 
  
 
 
 "Estimated Potential Water Needs for the Eastern Grand Prairie Region by Irrigation Scheduling," R. C. Peralta and P. W. Dutram, Agricultural Engineering Department, University of Arkansas, Fayetteville, AR. December 1983.
 "Using Target Levels to Develop a Sustained Yield Pumping Strategy in Arkansas, a Riparian Rights State," Richard C. Peralta and Ann W. Peralta, Appendix to the State Water Plan, May 1984.

Interbasin transfer
Buildings and structures in Arkansas
Water in Arkansas
Prairie County, Arkansas
Lonoke County, Arkansas
Arkansas County, Arkansas